Baba Aman (also Romanized as Bābā Amān; also known as Bavāmān Qal‘eh) is a village in Baba Aman Rural District, in the Central District of Bojnord County, North Khorasan Province, Iran. At the 2006 census, its population was 567, in 146 families.

References 

Populated places in Bojnord County